Tett is a surname. Notable people with the surname include:

Benjamin Tett (1798–1878), Ontario businessman and political figure
Brandon Tett (born 1987), Professional American football defensive linemen
Gillian Tett (born 1967), British author and journalist at the Financial Times
John Tett (1916–1974), Canadian athlete, wartime military pilot, physical fitness educator and public servant
Simon Tett, Climatologist working at the University of Edinburgh

See also 
Tett turret, is a type of hardened field fortification built in Britain during the invasion crisis of 1940–1941.

References